Altamiro Rossato (23 June 1925 – 13 May 2014) was a Brazilian Catholic prelate and Archbishop Emeritus of the Roman Catholic Archdiocese of Porto Alegre. He was Archbishop of Porto Alegre from 1991 till 2001.

Biography
Rossato was born in Campininha in the municipality of  Tuparendi in Rio Grande do Sul. and ordained as a priest in 1951 in São Paulo

Rossato continued his studies in Rome, Italy at the Pontifical University of St. Thomas Aquinas, Angelicum completing a Doctorate in Philosophy in 1953 and Doctorate in Theology in 1955.

He was ordained bishop in the city of Marabá, Para in 1985. He became of archbishop of Porto Alegre in 1989 and served in this role till 2001.

Death 
He died in hospital in St. Francis hospital in Porto Alegre at the age of 88 from multiple organ failure.

See also

References

1925 births
2014 deaths
20th-century Roman Catholic archbishops in Brazil
Roman Catholic bishops of Porto Alegre
Roman Catholic archbishops of Porto Alegre
Roman Catholic bishops of Marabá